Vagabond is the fifth album by folk duo Spiers and Boden.

Track listing

Personnel
Jon Boden (vocals, fiddle, guitar, stomp box)
John Spiers (vocals, melodeons, concertina).

References

Spiers and Boden albums
2008 albums